Cheick Oumar Condé (born 26 July 2000) is a Guinean professional footballer who plays as a midfielder for Swiss club FC Zürich and the Guinea national team.

Club career

Early years
Born in Conakry, Condé began his career with Guinean club Séquence de Dixinn.

MAS Táborsko
On 18 July 2019, Condé signed for Czech club MAS Táborsko.

Fastav Zlin
In January 2020, after playing fifteen league games for Táborsko, Condé signed for Fastav Zlín for a fee of 1.6 million Kč. On 15 February 2020, Condé made his Czech First League debut in a 2–0 loss away to Karviná.

FC Zürich
On 21 June 2022, Condé signed a four-year contract with FC Zürich in Switzerland.Conde made his debut for FC Zürich on July 7, 2022 in a 4-0 defeat to BSC Young Boys and spent 72 minutes on the field.

International career
In March 2022, Condé received his first call up for the Guinea national team for the country's upcoming games against South Africa and Zambia. He debuted with Guinea in a friendly 0–0 tie with South Africa on 25 March 2022.In September 2022, Conde received a national invitation for Guinea's friendlies to play against Algeria and Ivory Coast, he played in both competitions.

Style of play
Condé has been described as a box-to-box midfielder, drawing comparisons to West Ham United midfielder Tomáš Souček from former Fastav Zlín manager Bohumil Páník.

Career statistics

Club

International

References

External links

 Footballdatabase Profile
 Cheick Conde at SFL
 Cheick Conde at FC Zürich

2000 births
Living people
Sportspeople from Conakry
Guinean footballers
Guinea international footballers
Association football midfielders
FC Séquence de Dixinn players
FC Silon Táborsko players
FC Fastav Zlín players
Bohemian Football League players
Czech First League players
Expatriate footballers in the Czech Republic
Guinean expatriate sportspeople in the Czech Republic
Guinean expatriate footballers
FC Zürich players
Expatriate footballers in Switzerland
Guinean expatriate sportspeople in Switzerland